Muhurtha Naal is a 1967 Indian Tamil-language film produced and directed by P. Madhavan, and written by Balamurugan. The film stars Jaishankar, K. R. Vijaya and Muthuraman. It was released on 29 September 1967, and failed at the box office.

Plot

Cast 
 Jaishankar as Raju
 K. R. Vijaya as the tea plantation worker
 Muthuraman as Saravana
 Nagesh
 Madhavi
 Sandhya Rani as Uma

Production 
Muhurtha Naal was produced and directed by P. Madhavan, and written by Balakumaran.

Soundtrack 
The music was composed by K. V. Mahadevan. The song "Manikka Mookkuthi Madhurai" attained popularity.

Release and reception 
Muhurtha Naal was released on 29 September 1967, and distributed by Venkateshwara Movies. Kalki positively reviewed the film for various aspects, including the cast performances and Madhavan's direction. Despite this, it was a box office failure.

References

External links 
 

1960s Tamil-language films
Films directed by P. Madhavan
Films scored by K. V. Mahadevan